Gandab-e Olya (also Romanized as Gandāb-e ‘Olyā) is a village in Horr Rural District, Dinavar District, Sahneh County, Kermanshah Province, Iran. At the 2006 census, its population was 162, in 37 families.

References 

Populated places in Sahneh County